The Bamboo network or the Chinese Commonwealth is a term used to conceptualize connections between businesses operated by the Overseas Chinese community in Southeast Asia. The Overseas Chinese business networks constitute the single most dominant private business groups in Southeast Asia. It links the Overseas Chinese business community of Southeast Asia, namely Malaysia, Indonesia, Singapore, Thailand, Vietnam, the Philippines, and Myanmar with the economies of Greater China (Mainland China, Hong Kong, Macau, and Taiwan). The Overseas Chinese play an exceptionally prominent role in Southeast Asia's business sector. 

Since the turn of the 21st century, Southeast Asia has become an important pillar of the Overseas Chinese economy, and the bamboo network represents an important symbol indicating an extended international outpost for China.

Structure
As Overseas Chinese communities grew and developed in Southeast Asia, Chinese merchants and traders began to develop elaborate business networks for growth and survival. These elaborate business networks provide the resources for capital accumulation, marketing information, and distribution of goods and services between the Chinese business communities across Southeast Asia. Overseas Chinese businesses in Southeast Asia are usually family owned and managed through a centralized bureaucracy. The family becomes the centerpiece focus of the firm's business activities and provides the capital, labor, and management. The strength of the family firm lies in its flexibility of decision making and the dedication and loyalty of its labor force. The businesses are usually managed as family businesses to lower front office transaction costs as they are passed down from one generation to the next. Many firms generally exhibit a strong entrepreneurial spirit, family kinship, autocratic leadership, intuitive, parsimonious, and fast decision making style, as well as paternalistic management and a continuous chain of hierarchical orders. These bulk of these firms typically operate as small and medium-sized businesses rather than large corporate conglomerate entities typically dominant in other East Asian countries such as Japan and South Korea. Trade and financing is guided on extensions of traditional family clans and personal relationships are prioritized over formal relationships. This promotes commercial communication and more fluid transfer of capital in a region where financial regulation and the rule of law remain largely undeveloped in Southeast Asia.  

Bamboo networks are also transnational, which means channeling the movement of capital, information, and goods and services can promote the relative flexibility and efficiency between the formal agreements and transactions made by family-run firms. Business relationships are based on the Confucian paradigm of guanxi, the Chinese term for the cultivation of personal relationships as an ingredient for business success. The bamboo network has been heavily influenced by Confucianism, an ancient Chinese philosophy developed by philosopher Confucius in the 5th century BC that promotes filial piety and pragmatism with respect to the context of business. Confucianism remains a legitimizing philosophical force for the maintenance of a company's corporate identity and social welfare. Nurturing guanxi has also been attributed to as a significant mechanism for the implementation of cooperative business strategies in the bamboo network. For the Chinese, a strong network of contacts has always been an important pillar of Chinese business culture, following Confucianism's belief in the individual's inability to survive alone.

The bamboo network has served as a distinctive form of organizing economic activity through which groups of Han Chinese entrepreneurs, traders, investors, financiers, and their family businesses, as well as tightly-knit business networks have gradually expanded and have come to dominate the economy of Southeast Asia. The bamboo network also entails the structural substrate of companies, clans, and villages linked by ethnic ties of blood, family, and native place as part of a larger overseas bamboo network. Having a common ethnic heritage, shared linguistic origins, family ties, and ancestral roots have driven Overseas Chinese entrepreneurs to do business with one another rather than with their indigenous Southeast Asian counterparts in their host countries. Companies owned by the Overseas Chinese are a major economic juggernaut and dominate the private business sectors in every Southeast Asian country today.

Many of Southeast Asia's influential Overseas Chinese business leaders grew from fledgling entrepreneurs and emergent investors into thoroughly establishing themselves into the region's leading economic power players that eventually cornered all parts of the Southeast Asian financial and investment markets. Fuelled by the promise of great wealth and fortune while others driven by famine and war attracted hordes of entrepreneurial Han Chinese immigrants including merchants, craftsmen, and landless impoverished labourers that crossed the South China Sea to seek greener pastures to unlock and ultimately achieve their financial destinies. They formed Chinatowns for self-support, economic development, and promotion and protection of their business interests. Though there were immense hardships, many budding Chinese emigrant entrepreneurs and investors through thrift, shrewd business savvy and investment acumen, discipline, conscientiousness, and perseverance worked their way out of poverty to build a better life for themselves and their families.  Wherever the Overseas Chinese in Southeast Asia have settled down, they have exhibited a strong sense of entrepreneurship and hard work starting with small businesses such as laundries, restaurants, grocery stores, gas stations, teahouses, and gradually built themselves into full-fledged entrepreneurs, financiers, and brokers eventually cornering gambling dens, casinos, and real estate. Overseas Chinese businessmen that have shaped Southeast Asian business sphere in the twentieth century have spawned famous rags to riches success stories such as the Malaysian dealmaker Robert Kuok, Indonesian banker and retail proprietor Liem Sioe Liong, and his son, financier and money manager Liem Hong Sien in addition to fellow Fuqing native and Salim Group co-founder and investor Liem Oen Kian, Filipino billionaire Henry Sy, and Hong Kong business tycoon Li Ka-shing. Kuok's successful business record is similar to the achievements of many other prominent overseas Chinese businessmen who have paved the way for the Southeast Asian business scene during the 20th-century. Kuok's conglomerate encompasses a complex web of private and public companies. Many of his holdings include Wilmar International, a palm oil producer, PPB Group Berhad a sugar and flour miller, the Shangri-La hotel chain in Hong Kong, shipping line Pacific Carriers, real estate development company Kerry Properties, and formerly the Hong Kong newspaper publisher South China Morning Post (later sold to Alibaba) all of which in the aggregate total some $US5 billion.

Many of these entrepreneurs come from humble beginnings and possessed little initial wealth themselves, building their businesses from scratch and contributing to the local economic development of their host countries in the process. Many of them initially faced arduous struggles by starting off from scratch through uninspiring start-up businesses such as a corner shop that sold sugar in Malaysia, a village noodle shop in Indonesia, a surplus shoe store in the Philippines, and operating plastic flower manufacturing plants in Hong Kong.  These leading business titans and capitalist luminaries have made a name for themselves across the Southeast Asian business scene in addition to the thousands of budding Overseas Chinese entrepreneurs and investors who live in obscurity started off from humble beginnings as street merchants, peddlers, vendors, marketers, hawkers, dealers, and traders. Many would soon delve into real estate and then reinvested their proceeds and gains into any business that they deemed profitable. Many of these small and medium-sized businesses have evolved into gargantuan conglomerates, containing an umbrella of numerous corporate interests organized in a dozen of highly diversified subsidiaries. With the onset of globalization in the 21st-century, many Overseas Chinese entrepreneurs have been actively globalizing their domestic business operations and posing themselves as a global competitor in diverse industry sectors such as financial services, real estate, garment manufacturing, and hotel chains. From Thailand to Myanmar to Indonesia, Overseas Chinese business families oversee multibillion-dollar business empires that stretch from Shanghai to Kuala Lumpur to Mexico City. Overseas Chinese entrepreneurs and investors are major players in the Southeast Asian economy and have contributed substantially to the economic development of their host countries in Southeast Asia. Much of the business activity of the bamboo network is centered in the major cities of the region, such as Mandalay, Jakarta, Singapore, Bangkok, Kuala Lumpur, Ho Chi Minh City, and Manila.

History
The Overseas Chinese bamboo network has played a major role in invigorating the commercial life of Southeast Asia as postcolonial Southeast Asia has become an important pillar of the Overseas Chinese economy since the turn of the 20th century. Historically, the Chinese dominated trade and commercial life of Southeast Asia and have been an economically powerful and prosperous minority than their indigenous Southeast Asian majorities around them for hundreds of years long before the European colonial era.

Commercial influence of Chinese traders and merchants in Southeast Asia dates back at least to the third century AD, when official missions by the Han government were dispatched to countries in the Southern Seas. Distinct and stable Overseas Chinese communities became a feature of Southeast Asia by the mid-seventeenth century across major port cities of Indonesia, Thailand, and Vietnam. More than 1500 years ago, Chinese merchants began to sail southwards towards Southeast Asia in search of trading opportunities and wealth. These areas were known as Nanyang or the Southern Seas. Many of those who left China were Southern Han Chinese comprising the Hokkien, Teochew, Cantonese, Hakka and Hainanese who trace their ancestry from the southern Chinese coastal provinces, principally known as Guangdong, Fujian and Hainan. The Chinese established small trading posts, which in time grew and prospered along with their presence had come to control much of the economy in Southeast Asia. Periods of heavy emigration would send waves of Chinese into Southeast Asia as it was usually coincided with particularly poor conditions such as huge episodes of dynastic conflict, political uprisings, famine, and foreign invasions at home. Unrest and periodic upheaval throughout succeeding Chinese dynasties encouraged further emigration throughout the centuries. In the early 1400s, the Ming Dynasty Chinese Admiral Zheng He under the Yongle Emperor led a fleet of three hundred vessels around Southeast Asia during the Ming treasure voyages. During his maritime expedition across Southeast Asia, Zheng discovered an enclave of Overseas Chinese already prospering on the island of Java, Indonesia.

Since 1500, Southeast Asia has been a magnet for Chinese emigrants where they have strategically developed a bamboo network encompassing an elaborately diverse spectrum of economic activities spread across numerous industries that has transcended national boundaries. The Chinese were one commercial minority among many including Indian Gujaratis, Chettiars, Portuguese and Japanese until the middle of the seventeenth century. Subsequently, damage to the rival trade networks the English and Dutch in the Indian Ocean allowed the enterprising Chinese to take over the roles once held by the Japanese in the 1630s. The Overseas Chinese in Southeast Asia would soon become the sole indispensable buyers and sellers to the large European companies. By the 1700s, Overseas Chinese were the sole unrivaled commercial minority everywhere in Southeast Asia, having contributed significantly to the economic dynamism and prosperity of the region and have served as a catalyst for regional economic growth. Colonization of Southeast Asia by the European powers from the 16th to the 20th centuries opened up the region to large numbers of Chinese immigrants, most of whom originated from southeastern China. The largest of those were Hakka from the Fujian and Guangdong provinces. Substantial increases in the Overseas Chinese population of Southeast Asia began in the mid-eighteenth century. Chinese emigrants from southern China settled in Cambodia, Indonesia, Malaysia, the Philippines, Singapore, Thailand, Brunei, and Vietnam to seek their financial destiny through entrepreneurship and business success. They established at least one well-documented republic as a tributary state during the Qing dynasty, the Lanfang Republic that lasted from 1777 to 1884. Overseas Chinese populations in Southeast Asia saw a rapid increase following the Communist victory in the Chinese Civil War in 1949 which forced many refugees to emigrate outside of China causing a rapid expansion of the Overseas Chinese bamboo network.

Economic aptitude
Overseas Chinese entrepreneurs and investors play a role in the commerce and industry throughout the economies of Southeast Asia. Comprising less than ten percent of the population in Southeast Asia, Overseas Chinese are estimated to possess foreign exchange reserves totaling over US$100 billion, control two-thirds of the retail trade, and own 80 percent of all publicly listed companies by stock market capitalization across the Southeast Asian region. Though their economic prominence is particularly conspicuous among the public companies listed on all the major Southeast Asian stock markets, 90% of the small and medium-sized Southeast Asian businesses are also owned by the Overseas Chinese. Overseas Chinese in Southeast Asia also control 70 percent of the region's corporate wealth and 86 percent of Southeast Asia's billionaire's are of Chinese ancestry. Their middlemen minority status, shrewd business and investment acumen and economic prowess have led the Overseas Chinese to being heralded as the "Jews of Southeast Asia." In 1991, the World Bank estimated that the total economic output of the Southeast Asia's Overseas Chinese was about US$400 million and rose to US$600 million in 1996. The Overseas Chinese control 500 of the largest corporations in Southeast Asia with assets amounting to US$500 billion and additional liquid assets of US$2 trillion. The Overseas Chinese community collectively control virtually all of the regions most advanced and lucrative industries as well as its economic crown jewels. Overseas Chinese gained even greater economic power in Southeast Asia during the second half of the twentieth century in the midst of capitalist laissez faire policies enshrined by the European colonialists that were conducive to the Overseas Chinese middlemen. Economic power held by the Overseas Chinese across the Southeast Asian economies exert a tremendous impact on the regions per capita income, vitality of economic output, and aggregate prosperity. The powerful economic clout and influence held by the Chinese have entirely displaced their rival indigenous Southeast Asian majority counterparts into economic submission. The disproportionate amount of economic might held by the Overseas Chinese has led to resentment and bitterness among their indigenous Southeast Asian majority counterparts who feel that they cannot compete against Overseas Chinese-owned businesses in free market capitalist societies. The immense wealth disparity and abject poverty among the indigenous Southeast Asian majorities has resulted hostility, resentment, distrust, and anti-Chinese sentiment blaming their extreme socioeconomic failures on the Chinese. The economic dominance of the Overseas Chinese in Southeast Asia have aroused envy from the indigenous Southeast Asian majorities manifested in the form of social backlash and political repression. In addition, governments across Southeast Asia have enacted laws to curtail the economic power of the Overseas Chinese in order to advance the economic interests of the indigenous Southeast Asian majorities. Many of their indigenous Southeast Asian majority counterparts have dealt with the glaring wealth disparities by establishing socialist and communist dictatorships and authoritarian regimes to redistribute economic power more equitably at the expense of the more economically powerful and prosperous Chinese as well as giving affirmative action privileges to the indigenous Southeast Asian aborigine majorities first while imposing reverse discrimination against the Chinese minority to retain a more equitable balance of economic power.

1997 Asian financial crisis
Governments affected by the 1997 Asian financial crisis introduced laws regulating insider trading led to the loss of many monopolistic positions long held by the ethnic Chinese business elite and weakening the influence of the bamboo network. After the crisis, business relationships were more frequently based on contracts, rather than the trust and family ties of the traditional bamboo network.

21st century
Following the Chinese economic reforms initiated by Deng Xiaoping during the 1980s, businesses owned by the Chinese diaspora began to develop ties with companies based in Mainland China. As China itself geographically looms over Southeast Asia, its immense population size and territorial reach coupled with its geopolitical prominence on the international stage and enormous economy have posed amorphous threats to the small and medium sized countries of Southeast Asia. With China's entry into the global marketplace and its concurrent global economic expansion since the dawn of the 21st century, the Overseas Chinese community in Southeast Asia have served as a conduit for China's growing economic and geopolitical hegemony in the region. As China itself has been known for its receptive patronage and investment sponsorship of the Overseas Chinese community in Southeast Asia, who are ready and able to take part in the domestic affairs of other nations to protect the business interests of their fellow Chinese kinfolk. A major component of China's relationship with the Overseas Chinese is economic, as Overseas Chinese are an important of source of investment and financial capital for the Chinese economy. Overseas Chinese control up to $2 trillion in cash or liquid assets in the region and have considerable amounts of wealth to stimulate China's growing economic strength. Overseas Chinese also represent the biggest direct investors in Mainland China. Bamboo network businesses have established over 100,000 joint ventures and invested more than $50 billion in China, influenced by shared and existing ethnic, cultural and language affinities. Overseas Chinese also play a major role in the economic advancement of Mainland China where the relations between Mainland China and the Chinese diaspora in Southeast Asia are excellent and close ties are encouraged due to common ancestral origins as well as adhering to traditional Chinese ethics and values. The Overseas Chinese in Southeast Asia collectively control an economic spread worth US$700 billion with a combined wealth US$3.5 billion while financing 80 percent of Mainland China's foreign investment projects. Since the turn of the 21st century, postcolonial Southeast Asia has now become an important pillar of the international Overseas Chinese economy. In addition, Mainland China's transformation into a global economic power in the 21st century has led to a reversal in this relationship. Seeking to reduce its reliance on United States Treasury securities, the Chinese government through its state-owned enterprises shifted its focus to foreign investments. Protectionism in the United States has made it difficult for Chinese companies to acquire American assets, strengthening the role of the bamboo network as one of the major recipients of Chinese investments.

References

Further reading

External links 
 The Bamboo Network: Asia's Family-run Conglomerates – Strategy + Business January 1, 1998]

 
Chinese diaspora in Southeast Asia